Dreams of Glass is a 1970 American drama film directed by Robert Clouse. It marked Danny DeVito's film debut.

Plot
Ann is the owner of a famous nursery and greenhouse from the Japanese family. Tom is from a blue-collar family of self-employed fishermen. They make a relationship, despite obstacles their families get in their way.

Cast
John Denos as Tomm Parsegian
Caroline Barrett as Ann Murakoshi
Joe Lo Presti as Sam Parsegian
Donald Elson as Timothy
Danny DeVito as Thug
Smokestack Lightnin' as the band.

See also
 List of American films of 1970

References

External links

1970 films
1970s romance films
American romance films
Films directed by Robert Clouse
Films about Japanese Americans
1970s English-language films
1970s American films